Sogno ribelle is a 1992 compilation album from Italian rock band Litfiba that contains new versions of old songs with a more rock sounding, live tracks and an unreleased song "Linea d'ombra".

Track listing
Linea d'ombra  – 3:06
Corri  – 4:02
Proibito (Remix)  – 3:48
Bambino  – 5:02
Eroi nel vento  – 3:34
Cangaceiro (Versione Mix)  – 5:00
Tex (Remix)  – 5:35
Apapaia (Remix)  – 5:00
Istambul (Remix)  – 5:44
Paname (Nuova versione)  – 5:25
El Diablo (Live)  – 4:23
Ci sei solo tu (Live)  – 5:22
Cane (Live Montreux)  – 4:21

Personnel
Piero Pelù - Vocals
Ghigo Renzulli - Guitars
Daniele Trambusti - Drums
Antonio Aiazzi – Keyboards
Roberto Terzani - Bass

Recorded and mixed by Fabrizio Simoncioni
Produced by: Alberto Pirelli

Litfiba albums
1992 compilation albums
Italian-language albums